Pridraga is a village in Dalmatia, Croatia, located southeast of Novigrad, Zadar County. The population is 1,470 (census 2011).

References

Populated places in Zadar County